The Khānabād River flows in the provinces of Takhar and Kunduz in northern Afghanistan.  The Khanabad River is a tributary of the Kunduz River, which is in turn a tributary of the Amu River.

Course
The Khanabad rises in the south east of Takhar Province, in Warsaj District in the Hindu Kush.   It flows north west, and receives a number of glacier-fed tributaries.  As far as the small village of Shuri (a little north of Farkhar) the river flows in a narrow valley, then enters a broad plain.  Its waters here are much used for irrigation.  It then flows through Taloqan, the capital of Takhar Province, and a little after enters Kunduz Province.  It then flows through Khanabad, turns west and flows to the north of Kunduz.  It enters the Kunduz River 30 km past Kunduz.

The total length of the river is about 400 km.

Tributaries

The Khanabad receives many tributaries, fed mainly by glaciers and snow melt in spring and summer.  They include:
 Warsaj, flowing from the south of Takhar Province  
 Khost, a glacier-fed strong-flowing tributary rising in Baghlan Province  
 Shal 
 Narik

References

External links
 Delft Hydraulics - Integrated Water Resources Management for the Sistan Closed Inland Delta - ANNEX B : Forecasting the Flow from Afghanistan - Page 18 : cartes hydrographiques d'Afghanistan
 Map of Takhar Province
 Map of Baghlan Province

Rivers of Afghanistan
Landforms of Takhar Province
Landforms of Kunduz Province